Saint-Mandrier-sur-Mer ("Saint-Mandrier on Sea"), commonly referred to simply as Saint-Mandrier (former official name), is a commune in the southeastern French department of Var, Provence-Alpes-Côte d'Azur region. In 2018, it had a population of 5,979. Across the harbour from the military port of Toulon, first naval base in Europe by size and homeport of the aircraft carrier Charles de Gaulle, flagship of the French Navy, Saint-Mandrier-sur-Mer is home to a fishing port of its own, tucked into a small inlet. Its inhabitants are called Mandréens (masculine) and Mandréennes (feminine).

History
Situated on the Isle de Sépet until a causeway was constructed between 1630 and 1657, what is now the town shows evidence of long habitation. A Phoenician tower once stood on the island, while the area was cleared for farming in the 6th century. The Phoenician tower was converted to a Christian chapel in 566 and the church of Saint-Honorat was built in 1020.

The causeway to the mainland (the Isthme des Sablettes) not only led to the creation of an independent town, but the use of the area as a battery station for the heavily fortified port of Toulon. Fishing and naval work dominated the town, with the construction of the "Infirmerie Royale Saint-Louis" naval hospital, becoming the 1818 the "Hôpital Maritime Saint-Mandrier" in 1818. In the 19th century, Saint-Mandrier-sur-Mer also was home to sailmaking. Naval aviation and the Fleet Mechanics and Pilots School (École des Mécaniciens et Chauffeurs de la flotte, GEM) were located in the town in the 1930s.

In World War II, Saint-Mandrier-sur-Mer was fortified with two turrets, each mounting a pair of 340mm naval guns taken the French battleship Provence.  This fortress controlled the approaches to Toulon; the range and power of these guns was such that a considerable Allied naval force was required to destroy them. Part of the fleet and the first to engage the battery was the Free French battleship Lorraine, sister ship to the Provence and mounting the same type of gun. The Allies, who termed the battery 'Big Willie', dedicated a battleship or heavy cruiser to shelling it every day; eventually  silenced the guns on 23 August 1944, although the fortress would not be taken until 28th.

In 1948, the World War I cemetery in Saint-Mandrier-sur-Mer was made a national necropolis. In 1961, it received the remains of an additional 975 Italian soldiers killed in World War II while fighting for the Allies. The cemetery also features the necropolis of Admiral Louis-René Levassor de Latouche Tréville, who served as commander of the naval forces in the Mediterranean under Napoleon.

On 11 April 1950, Saint-Mandrier was made an independent commune from La Seyne-sur-Mer. Louis Clément of the Socialist Party (PS) served as its first mayor for over 20 years. On 16 April 1951, it was officially renamed Saint-Mandrier-sur-Mer.

Geography

Climate

Saint-Mandrier-sur-Mer has a hot-summer Mediterranean climate (Köppen climate classification Csa).

Demographics

Economy
Once home to a French Naval Air station, its location near the homeport of the French Navy at Toulon has meant that the military has played a huge economic role in the life of the town. Increasingly, Saint-Mandrier-sur-Mer is focused on the tourist industry.

See also
Communes of the Var department

References

External links

 ville-saintmandrier.fr: official website.
 Provenceweb.fr:  Saint Mandrier sur Mer.

Communes of Var (department)
Populated coastal places in France